"Wild Thing" is a single by American rapper Tone Lōc from his 1989 album Lōc-ed After Dark.  The title is a reference to the phrase "doin' the wild thing," a euphemism for sex. According to producer Mario Caldato Jr., who engineered and mixed the song, producer Michael Ross was inspired by an utterance of Fab 5 Freddy “Come on baby let’s do the wild thing" in Spike Lee's She's Gotta Have It, and asked Young MC to write the lyrics.

Tone Lōc's song peaked at number two on the Billboard Hot 100 in February 1989, only behind Paula Abdul's breakthrough hit  "Straight Up".

It inspired at least two parodies (the Gilligan's Island-themed "Isle Thing" by "Weird Al" Yankovic, which was Yankovic's first rap parody; and "Child King" by Christian band ApologetiX). It eventually sold over two million copies. It also peaked at number 21 on the UK Singles Chart. In 2008, "Wild Thing" was ranked number 39 on Vh1's 100 Greatest Songs of Hip Hop.

Sampling controversy
The song uses an uncredited sample of Van Halen's "Jamie's Cryin'". Van Halen's management at the time asked for a flat fee (credited in some reports to be US$5,000) as payment to have the song sampled by Tone Lōc. Apparently, the sampling decision was made without consulting the band's original members (credited as co-authors of the song). They had no idea "Wild Thing" would become a major hit. A subsequent civil lawsuit was settled out of court, with Van Halen receiving US$180,000 as settlement payment. Alex Van Halen has said that he had heard partially "Wild Thing" over the radio and didn't realize his song had been sampled until he recognized his (by now famous) tom-tom break at least a few times. Concerning the settlement, he said: "Well, at least we got something. Tone Lōc and his people made millions out of it..."

Music video
A music video directed by Tamra Davis was made for the song at a reported cost of  $500, copying the style of Robert Palmer's "Addicted to Love." Mini-skirted women play guitars next to Tone Lōc; the video was frequently shown on MTV. The leading lady in the video is played by actress Tracy Camilla Johns.

Peaches remix

"Wild Thing (Peaches Remix)" is a version of Tone Lōc's "Wild Thing". The song features vocals by Tone Lōc and Peaches herself. This remix was made to celebrate Delicious Vinyl's 20th anniversary. It peaked at No. 4 on the U.S. Billboard Hot Dance Singles Sales.

Music video
The music video for "Wild Thing Remix" shows Peaches and Tone Lōc performing live at Avalon during the celebration of the 20th anniversary of Delicious Vinyl.

Uses in popular culture
"Wild Thing" was used in the 1989 film Uncle Buck (starring John Candy) during the scene when the titular character goes to the school of his nephew and niece to talk to the principal.

In 1991, figure skater Tonya Harding used the track of "Wild Thing" in the last third of her free skate to win the U.S. Figure Skating Championships.

In the 2000 film Bedazzled, the song is used when Brendan Fraser's character, Elliot, first meets the Devil, played by Liz Hurley.

In Charlie's Angels: Full Throttle (2003), the song is used to soundtrack the scene in which Cameron Diaz's character, Natalie, rides a mechanical bull.
In Taxi (2004), Gisele Bunchen's character Vanessa is introduced by the song walking out of a building with her female henchmen as they prepare for another bank robbery.

The song is also heard, in much-edited form, in the 2016 film The Angry Birds Movie.

In 1989, the song was used in the Season One episode of the TV series Midnight Caller entitled "The Fall". Also in 1989, the song was used in the pilot episode of Doogie Howser, M.D. .

In 2012, Bob Sinclar and Snoop Dogg made an electro house cover.

Charts

Weekly charts

Year-end charts

Certifications

References

Tone Lōc songs
1988 songs
1989 debut singles
2007 singles
Music videos directed by Tamra Davis
Number-one singles in New Zealand
Peaches (musician) songs
Songs about prostitutes
Song recordings produced by Peaches (musician)
Songs written by Young MC
Delicious Vinyl singles
4th & B'way Records singles
Rap rock songs
Sampling controversies
Van Halen